Shandong Foreign Languages Vocational College (colloquially known as Shanwai,  is a private institution of tertiary education in Rizhao, Shandong province, China. It has its campus to the north of the University City in Donggang District. Though the focus of the school is foreign languages, it also offers majors in other disciplines.

History 
The establishment of Shanwai was done as a joint-venture, with most of the investment hailing from Xi'an. Having received approval by the government in 2005, the college is one of the newest in Shandong. From 2013 on, it will change the name to Shandong Foreign Languages College and offer Bachelor courses in certain subjects in addition to the already existing Associate degrees.

Administration

Faculties 
At present, Shanwai has the following five faculties:
College of Foreign Languages
College of Economic Management
College of Information Engineering
College of International Business
College of Continuing Education

References

External links
 Shandong Foreign Languages Vocational college website 

Universities and colleges in Shandong